George McKay (15 April 1884 – 3 December 1945) was a Russian-American actor. He appeared in more than one hundred films from 1929 to 1946.

Selected filmography

References

External links 

1884 births
1945 deaths
American male film actors
20th-century American male actors
Russian male film actors
Actors from Minsk
Emigrants from the Russian Empire to the United States